Buckner House is a historic home located at Marshall, Saline County, Missouri. It was built in 1906, and is a two-story, three bay, Classical Revival style frame dwelling with a hipped roof. It measures 48 feet by 48 feet and rests on a cut stone and concrete foundation. The front facade features an elaborate double porch.

It was added to the National Register of Historic Places in 1984.

References

Houses on the National Register of Historic Places in Missouri
Neoclassical architecture in Missouri
Houses completed in 1906
Buildings and structures in Saline County, Missouri
National Register of Historic Places in Saline County, Missouri
1906 establishments in Missouri